Arthur J. Plowman (October 28, 1872 – September 28, 1942) was an American politician, farmer, and businessman.

Born in the town of Waupaca, Plowman moved to Elderon, Wisconsin, in 1897, where he was a farmer and raised Guernsey dairy cows. He was involved with the bank, telephone and creamery businesses. He served on the Elderon Town Board. the Marathon County, Wisconsin Board of Supervisor, and as clerk on the local school board. Plowman was also involved with the Marathon County Agricultural Society. Plowman served in the Wisconsin State Assembly and was a Democrat.

Notes

1872 births
1942 deaths
People from Marathon County, Wisconsin
People from Waupaca, Wisconsin
Businesspeople from Wisconsin
Farmers from Wisconsin
Wisconsin city council members
County supervisors in Wisconsin
School board members in Wisconsin
Democratic Party members of the Wisconsin State Assembly